António Henriques Morato (born 20 March 1937) is a Portuguese former footballer who played as a defender.

Club career
Born in Lisbon, Morato spent seven seasons in the Primeira Liga with local club Sporting CP. In 1961–62 he contributed 21 appearances to help the team win the national championship, the only in his career.

In the top division, Morato also represented Vitória F.C. and Lusitano GC. He retired in 1968, aged 31.

International career
Morato's only cap for the Portugal national side arrived on 8 October 1961, in a 4–2 away loss against Luxembourg for the 1962 FIFA World Cup qualifiers.

Personal life
Morato's son, also named António, was also an international footballer.

References

External links

1937 births
Living people
Portuguese footballers
Footballers from Lisbon
Association football defenders
Primeira Liga players
Liga Portugal 2 players
Sporting CP footballers
Vitória F.C. players
Lusitano G.C. players
F.C. Barreirense players
Clube Oriental de Lisboa players
Portugal international footballers